KSPD (790 AM) is a radio station broadcasting a Christian talk and teaching format, licensed to Boise, Idaho, United States. The station is owned by Inspirational Family Radio.

History
The station began broadcasting April 27, 1961, and originally held the call sign KEST. In 1970, the station's call sign was changed to KSPD, and the station adopted a progressive rock format. By 1975, the station had adopted an all news format, which it continued to air into the 1980s. By 1989, the station had adopted a religious format.

References

External links
KSPD's official website

FCC History Cards for KSPD

SPD
Radio stations established in 1961
1961 establishments in Idaho